The Bloc of Communists and Socialists (BCS), previously known as the Electoral Bloc of Communists and Socialists (BECS), is a communist and democratic socialist political alliance in Moldova formed in May ahead of the 2021 Moldovan parliamentary election. Its members are the Party of Communists of the Republic of Moldova (PCRM) and the Party of Socialists of the Republic of Moldova (PSRM).

History 
Talks about the formation of a pre-election coalition were launched by the representatives of the PSRM in April 2021. In early May, Igor Dodon sent a proposal to the PCRM president Vladimir Voronin to form an electoral coalition. The Central Committee of the PCRM approved by a majority the formation of a electoral coalition on 11 May, the PSRM announced and a day later that they are willing to sign the protocol for the formation of the coalition. The Central Electoral Commission accepted the request to form the Electoral Bloc of Communists and Socialists on 13 May, and Voronin was chosen as the head of the coalition.

A snap election was announced for 11 July 2021, in which the BECS participated under a common ballot list led by Voronin, the head of the BECS coalition.

Ideology 
In the context of the Moldovan political spectrum, it is a political alliance which has espoused syncretic politics, combining left-wing politics on fiscal issues and conservative views on social issues, the latter of which is in contrast with left-wing Western European parties; it reflects the situation of LGBT rights in Moldova as one of the most social conservative post-Communist countries in Eastern Europe. The alliance is anti-NATO, Russophilic, and opposes the unification of Moldova and Romania.

Electoral performance

References

External links 
 About us (in Romanian)

2021 establishments in Moldova
Political party alliances in Moldova
Russian political parties in Moldova